Kosco Glacier is a glacier about  long, flowing from the Anderson Heights vicinity of the Bush Mountains of Antarctica northward to enter the Ross Ice Shelf between Wilson Portal and Mount Speed. It was discovered by the United States Antarctic Service, 1939–41, and was named by the Advisory Committee on Antarctic Names for Captain George F. Kosco, U.S. Navy, chief aerologist and chief scientist of U.S. Navy Operation Highjump, 1946–47.

References

Glaciers of Dufek Coast